An election to Preseli Pembrokeshire District Council was held in May 1987.  It was preceded by the 1983 election and followed by the 1991 election. On the same day there were elections to the other local authorities and community councils in Wales.

Boundary Changes
There was a slight reduction in the number of seats. Those abolished included Nevern, Steynton, and one of the three seats in both Fishguard and Milford North and West. Other wards were realigned or renamed.

Results

Brawdy (one seat)

Burton (one seat)

Camrose (one seat)

Cilgerran (one seat)

Clydey (one seat)

Crymych (one seat)

Dinas Cross (one seat)

Fishguard (two seats)

Goodwick(one seat)

Haverfordwest Castle (one seat)

Haverfordwest Garth (three seats)

Haverfordwest Prendergast (one seat)

Haverfordwest Priory (one seat)

Johnston (one seat)

Letterston (one seat)

Llangwm (one seat)

Maenclochog (one seat)

Merlin's Bridge (one seat)

Milford Haven, Central and East (three seats)
Stan Hudson stood as a Conservative, having not been affiliated to any party at the 1983 election.

Milford Haven, Hakin and Hubberston (three seats)
Labour had held one of the three seats in 1983 but it had been subsequently lost at a by-election. Basil Woodruff, the sitting county councillor, won a seat at the expense of another Independent.

Milford Haven, North and West (two seats)
The number of seats was reduced from three to two.

Newport (one seat)

Neyland West (one seat)

Neyland East (one seat)

Rudbaxton(one seat)

St David's (one seat)

St Dogmaels (one seat)

St Ishmaels (one seat)

Scleddau (one seat)

Solva (one seat)

The Havens(one seat)

Wiston (one seat)

References

Preseli Pembrokeshire District Council elections
Preseli Pembrokeshire District Council election